Pimelea humilis, also known  as common riceflower or dwarf riceflower, is a species of flowering plant in the family Thymelaeaceae and is endemic to south-eastern Australia. It is an erect or scrambling shrub with hairy stems, elliptic to lance-shaped leaves and heads of 12 to 52 of creamy-white, bisexual or female flowers.

Description

Common riceflower is similar to P. linifolia but is smaller, softer and has hairy stems.

Taxonomy
Pimelea humilis was first formally described by Robert Brown in Prodromus Florae Novae Hollandiae in 1810. The specific epithet (humilis) means "low" or "low-growing".

Distribution and habitat
Common riceflower grows in heath, woodland, forest and grassland, often in sandy soil. It is widespread and common in Victoria, but less common in New South Wales, growing at Robertson and south of Eden. It also occurs east of the Mount Lofty Range in South Australia and in north-eastern Tasmania.

References

humilis
Flora of New South Wales
Flora of South Australia
Flora of Tasmania
Flora of Victoria (Australia)
Malvales of Australia
Plants described in 1810
Taxa named by Robert Brown (botanist, born 1773)